The Asquith Magpies Rugby League Football Club is an Australian rugby league football club based in Asquith, New South Wales formed in 1953. They previously competed in the NSW Ron Massey Cup competition and the Sydney Shield.  Asquith are currently a senior feeder club side to NSW Cup team the North Sydney Bears.

Notable players
 Mitchell Pearce (2007- Sydney Roosters, Newcastle Knights)
 Liam Foran (2008-13 Melbourne Storm, Manly-Warringah Sea Eagles & Salford City Reds)
 Kieran Foran (2009- Manly-Warringah Sea Eagles, Parramatta Eels, New Zealand Warriors & Canterbury-Bankstown Bulldogs)
 Kevin Wilson 1970 to 1976 - then graded to North Sydney Bears playing all Grades including Captain of First Grade.

Playing Record in NSWRL Competitions

Tier 3
In three different time-periods, Asquith has entered teams in lower tier competitions run by the New South Wales Rugby League.
The win-loss-draw record in the table below includes Finals Series matches.
Sources: Rugby League Week, Big League, NSWRL Rugby League News, Sydney Morning Herald, Daily Telegraph (Sydney), League Unlimited.

Tier 4

See also

List of rugby league clubs in Australia

Sources

References

External links

Rugby league teams in Sydney
Rugby clubs established in 1953
1953 establishments in Australia
Ron Massey Cup
Asquith, New South Wales